The 1926 Volta a Catalunya was the eighth edition of the Volta a Catalunya cycle race and was held from 22 August to 29 August 1926. The race started and finished in Barcelona. The race was won by Victor Fontan.

Route and stages

General classification

References

1926
Volta
1926 in Spanish road cycling
August 1926 sports events